Rumyana Karapetrova (born February 7, 1982, in Kazanlak) is a Bulgarian javelin thrower.

She finished sixth at the 2006 European Championships with a career best throw of 61.78 metres. She also finished tenth at the 2005 World Championships, and competed at the 2007 World Championships and the 2008 Olympic Games without reaching the final.

Achievements

External links

1982 births
Living people
Bulgarian female javelin throwers
Athletes (track and field) at the 2008 Summer Olympics
Olympic athletes of Bulgaria
Bulgarian people of Armenian descent
People from Kazanlak